The International Circle of Korean Linguistics is a scholarly organization dedicated to the promotion of awareness of, the dissemination of information about, and the facilitation of communication among those in the field of, Korean language and linguistics. It was founded on October 20, 1975. It publishes the journal Korean Linguistics.

The ICKL holds meetings in various locales across the globe every two years. Recent meetings:

2017  Helsinki, Finland 
2015  Chicago, Illinois, USA 
2012  Xuzhou, Jiangsu Province, China 
2010  Ulaanbataar, Mongolia 
2008  Ithaca, New York, USA
2006  Guadalajara, Mexico
2004  Çolakli, Turkey
2002  Oslo, Norway
2000  Prague, Czech Republic
1998  Honolulu, Hawai'i, USA
1996  Brisbane, Australia
1994  London, United Kingdom
1992  Washington, DC, USA
1990  Osaka, Japan
1988  Toronto, Canada

See also
 Linguistics

References

External links
ICKL official site

Korean language
Linguistic societies